We All Shine is the second mixtape by American rapper and singer YNW Melly, released on January 18, 2019, through 300 Entertainment. It features the song "Mixed Personalities", which became famous after the rapper obtained a feature from Kanye West.

Commercial performance
In YNW Melly's home country of the United States, We All Shine debuted at number 27 on the US Billboard 200. In Canada, the mixtape peaked at number 27 on the Canadian Albums Chart. On April 9, 2020, the mixtape was certified gold by the Recording Industry Association of America for over 500,000 album-equivalent units.

Track listing
Credits adapted from Genius.
All tracks written by Jamell Demons, Kanye Omari West & Fredrick Givens II.

Charts

Weekly charts

Year-end charts

Certifications

References

2018 mixtape albums
YNW Melly albums